The 2001 Scottish Claymores season was the seventh season for the franchise in the NFL Europe League (NFLEL). The team was led by head coach Gene Dahlquist in his first year, and played its home games at Hampden Park in Glasgow, Scotland. They finished the regular season in fourth place with a record of four wins and six losses.

Offseason

Free agent draft

Personnel

Staff

Roster

Schedule

Standings

Game summaries

Week 1: vs Frankfurt Galaxy

Notes

References

Scotland
Scottish Claymores seasons